Louis Cameron Gossett Jr. (born May 27, 1936) is an American actor. Born in Coney Island, Brooklyn, New York City,  He had his stage debut at the age of 17, in a school production of You Can't Take It with You. Shortly after he successfully auditioned for the Broadway play Take a Giant Step. Gossett would go on acting on stage. One of these plays was A Raisin in the Sun in 1959, and in 1961 he made his debut on screen in its film adaptation. From thereon, Gossett added to his resume many roles in films and television, as well as releasing music. In 1977, Gossett gained wide recognition for his role of Fiddler in the popular miniseries Roots. For which he won "Outstanding lead actor for a single appearance in a drama or comedy series" at the Emmy Awards.

Gossett continued acting in high profile films and television. In 1982, for his role as Gunnery Sergeant Emil Foley in An Officer and a Gentleman,  he won the Academy Award for Best Supporting Actor, and became the first black actor to win in this category. At the Emmy Awards, Gossett continued to receive recognition with acting nominations for The Sentry Collection Presents Ben Vereen: His Roots (1978), Palmerstown, U.S.A. (1981), Sadat (1983), A Gathering of Old Men (1987), Touched by an Angel (1997), and Watchmen (2019).  He won and was nominated at other ceremonies including the Golden Globe Awards, Black Reel Awards, NAACP Image Awards, etc. Gossett is also well known for his role as Colonel Chappy Sinclair in the Iron Eagle film series (1986-1995).

Since his beginnings, Gossett appeared in a wide range of project. Film projects include Hal Ashby's The Landlord (1970), Paul Bogart's Skin Game (1971), George Cukor's Travels with My Aunt (1972), Stuart Rosenberg's The Laughing Policeman (1974), Philip Kaufman's The White Dawn (1974), Peter Yates's The Deep (1977), Wolfgang Petersen's Enemy Mine (1985), Christopher Cain's The Principal (1987), Mark Goldblatt's The Punisher (1989), Daniel Petrie's Toy Soldiers (1991), etc. As well as television appearance in Bonanza (1971), The Jeffersons (1975), American Playhouse (1990), Stargate SG-1 (2005), Boardwalk Empire (2013), The Book of Negroes (2015), etc. He also acted in video-games, commercials, and continued to work on stage.

Early life and education
Gossett was born in Coney Island, Brooklyn, New York City, to Hellen Rebecca (née Wray), a nurse, and Louis Gossett Sr., a porter. He is an alumnus of Mark Twain Intermediate School 239 and Abraham Lincoln High School. His stage debut came at the age of 17, in a school production of You Can't Take It with You when a sports injury resulted in the decision to take an acting class. Polio had already delayed his graduation.

His high school teacher had encouraged him to audition for a Broadway part, resulting in his selection for a starring role on Broadway in 1953 from among 200 other actors well before he entered NYU.

After graduating from Abraham Lincoln High School in 1954, he attended New York University, declining an athletic scholarship.

Career

1953 to 1977: music career and early roles to breakthrough 
In 1953, Gossett acted in the Broadway play Take a Giant Step. He replaced Bill Gunn as Spencer Scott. The play was selected by The New York Times drama critics as one of the 10 best shows of the year. He was 17, and still a student at Abraham Lincoln High School, with no formal drama training.

1955, Gossett acted in the Broadway play The Desk Set.

In 1959, continuing his Broadway theatre career, Gossett played the role of George Murchison in A Raisin in the Sun.

During the early 1960s, Gossett was considered to be a talented folk musician. He was also well known. His singing career was helped along with appearing at the Folk City venue in New York.

In 1961, Gossett had his cinematic debut with the play's film adaptation of A Raisin in the Sun.

Also in 1961, Gossett appeared in the original cast of Jean Genet's The Blacks, the longest running off-Broadway play of the decade, running for 1,408 performances. The original cast also featured James Earl Jones, Roscoe Lee Browne, Cicely Tyson, Godfrey Cambridge, Maya Angelou and Charles Gordone.

In 1963, Gossett acted in the Broadway play Tambourines to Glory.

In 1964, Gossett acted tin the Broadway play Golden Boy.

Signed to Powertree Records, Gossett's single, "Hooka' Dooka'", "Green Green" bw "Goodmornin' Captain" was released in early 1964. Later in May, "Red Rosy Bush" bw "See See Rider" was released.

In 1965, Gossett appeared in the musical play The Zulu and the Zayda on Broadway as Paulus with music and lyrics by Harold J. Rome. A December, 1965 review of The Zulu, original cast recording that was released on Columbia Records noted Menasha Skulnik and Gossett's vocal performance of "It's Good to Be Alive.

In 1966, Gossett acted in the Broadway play My Sweet Charlie. Gossett wrote the antiwar folk song "Handsome Johnny" with Richie Havens; Havens recorded the song in 1966.

In 1967, the song "Handsome Johnny" was released appearing  on Richie Havens's album Mixed Bag, which he co-composed with Havens . Havens performed it on the Johnny Carson Show which resulted in a standing ovation that lasted through two commercial breaks. By September, 1967, his single "Where Have All the Flowers Gone" bw "Just a Girl" was released on Warner Brothers 7078. It was a Cash Box Newcomer Pick and received a good review with the reviewer calling it "Easy-paced blues working and a mighty fine smooth vocal join forces in putting across a tempting r&b reading of the folk standard."

In 1968, Gossett acted in the play Carry Me Back to Morningside Heights.

In the spring of 1969, Gossett was listed among the actors who could not be determined or uncredited in Stuart Rosenberg's WUSA.

In 1970, his album From Me to You was released on B.T. Puppy Records BTPS-1013. It contained some of his own compositions. That same year, he acted in the film The Landlord directed by Hal Ashby.

In 1971, Gossett acted in Paul Bogart's Skin Game. That year Gossett, was cast in a film adaptation of the novel Finding Maubee, however the project went dormant, and was released as The Mighty Quinn in 1989 with another cast. Also that year he acted in the play Murderous Angels. On February 7, Gossett acted in The Desperado a Bonanza episode.

In 1972, Gossett acted in George Cukor's Travels with My Aunt. That he was announced to act in a starring role in Brian De Palma's Sisters, but had to withdraw due to scheduling conflict, and to play a gang leader in Barry Shear's Across 110th Street, but he is not in the finished product.

In 1973, Gossett acted in Stuart Rosenberg's The Laughing Policeman.

In 1974, Gossett acted in Philip Kaufman's The White Dawn.

On November 22, 1975, Gossett acted in George's Best Friend an episode of The Jeffersons.

In 1976, Gossett acted in films, including Arthur Marks's J. D.'s Revenge, and Krishna Shah's The River Niger.

In 1977, Gossett played the role of Fiddler in the television miniseries Roots based on Alex Haley's book Roots: The Saga of an American Family. The miniseries played for eight evenings in a row and had a rating of 44.9 and an audience share of 66, the highest of its time. The show also broke conventions where black actors would play the slave heroes against white villains, and popularized the night-to-night miniseries format. The reviews were a rave, and it received numerous accolades. At the Emmy Awards it received a total of 43 wins and nomination, in the category "Outstanding lead actor for a single appearance in a drama or comedy series" Gossett won.

That year in films, Gossett acted Robert Aldrich's The Choirboys, and Peter Yates's The Deep.

1978 to 1997: subsequent success 
On March 2, 1978, the television special The Sentry Collection Presents Ben Vereen: His Roots  premiered. Actor Ben Vereen showcases key elements of his life through dance and music. Gossett was among the guest stars. At the Emmy Awards, Gossett was nominated for "Outstanding continuing or single performance by a supporting actor in variety or music". On April 10, the two part television program To Kill a Cop premiered. In it Gossett is paired with Joe Don Baker as police detective.

On the 28th of January, 1979, the mini-series Backstairs at the White House premiered. It is an adaption of the book My Thirty Years Backstairs at the White House, about White House servants who served there during several presidencies. Gossett plays a servant who is 37 years of age when the series starts and 88 when it ends. He said ''I took the role because of the chance to age". At the Emmy Awards, Gossett was nominated for "Outstanding lead actor in a limited series or a special".

In 1981, Gossett was a guest star in an episode of the television series Palmerstown, U.S.A.. For his performance Gossett was nominated at the Emmy Awards for "Outstanding lead actor in a drama series".

In 1982, Gossett was also starring in the science fiction series, The Powers of Matthew Star which lasted until 1983.

That same year An Officer and a Gentleman,  His role as drill instructor Gunnery Sergeant Emil Foley in the 1982 film An Officer and a Gentleman won him an Academy Award for Best Supporting Actor. He was the first black male to win an Oscar in a supporting role, the second black male to win for acting, and the third black actor to win overall. Additionally, Gossett won "Best supporting actor" at the Golden Globe Awards, and "Outstanding actor in a motion picture" NAACP Image Awards.

In 1983, he played the title role in Sadat, a two part miniseries which chronicled the life and assassination of former Egypt president Anwar Sadat. For his performance Gossett was nominated at the Emmy Awards for "Outstanding lead actor in a limited series or a special", and at the Golden Globes Awards he was nominated for "Best Actor in limited series, anthology series or television motion picture".

That same year, Gossett acted in Joe Alves's Jaws 3-D.

In 1984 Gossett acted in Richard Lester's Finders Keepers.

In 1985, Gossett co-starred with Dennis Quaid in Wolfgang Petersen's Enemy Mine.

On January 17, 1986, Sidney J. Furie's Iron Eagle was released, an aviation adventure film were Gossett stars Colonel Chappy Sinclair. It earned $24,159,872 at the U.S. box office. Although the movie was not a major success at the cinema, it generated $11 million in home video sales, enough to justify a sequel. Also that year, Gossett co-starred with Chuck Norris in J. Lee Thompson's Firewalker.

In 1987, Gossett acted in Volker Schlöndorff's A Gathering of Old Men. While it was screened in the Un Certain Regard section at the 1987 Cannes Film Festival, it was released as television film in the US. For his performance Gossett was nominated at the Emmy Awards for "Outstanding lead actor in a miniseries or a special".

Also that year he acted in Christopher Cain's The Principal.

In 1988, Gossett reunited with director Sidney J. Furie for Iron Eagle II. It made $10,497,324 at the U.S. box office.

In 1989, Gossett co-starred in the Marvel Comics adaptation The Punisher, with Dolph Lundgren in the title role. The film was directed by Mark Goldblatt, with a screenplay by Boaz Yakin. The Punisher was filmed in Sydney, Australia and also featured Jeroen Krabbé, Kim Miyori, and Barry Otto.

On February 14, 1990, Gossett acted in Zora is my name! an episode of American Playhouse.

In 1991, Gossett acted in Manny Coto's Cover Up, and Daniel Petrie's Toy Soldiers. On March 16, HBO premiered the television film The Josephine Baker Story. For his acting at the Golden Globes Awards, in the television category, Gossett won "Best supporting actor".

In 1992, provided additional narration for Bill Miles and Nina Rosenblum's documentary film The Liberators: Fighting on Two Fronts in World War II. Gossett returned to the role of Chappy in Aces: Iron Eagle III directed by John Glen, and acted in Michael Ritchie's Diggstown.

In 1994, Gossett acted in Bruce Beresford's A Good Man in Africa.

In 1995, Gossett returned to the role of Chappy and reunited with director Sidney J. Furie for Iron Eagle IV.

In 1996, Gossett acted in the Broadway play Chicago. That year he acted in Arthur Penn's film Inside which was screened at Cannes before being released as a television film, where he also served as an executive producer. For his effort Gossett received CableACE Award nomination for "Best actor in a movie or mini-series.

In 1997, Gossett presented When Animals Attack! 4, a one-hour special on Fox. On television, he had a guest role in  theTouched by an Angel episode Amazing Grace: Part 1. For his performance he was nominated for "Outstanding guest actor in a drama series".

1998 to present day: following roles and current works 
In 1998, Gossett acted Bram Stoker's Legend of the Mummy.

In 2004, Gossett voiced the Vortigaunts in the video game Half-Life 2.

In the 2005 film Left Behind: World at War, he played the role of the U.S. President. That year on television, he played Free Jaffa Leader Gerak in several episodes of Season 9 of the sci-fi television series Stargate SG-1.

In 2007, he acted in Tyler Perry's Daddy's Little Girls. That year, he provided the voice of Lucius Fox in The Batman animated series.

In 2008, he filmed the "Keep It Real" series of commercials for the Namibian lager Windhoek.

In 2009, Gossett also lent his voice talents in the Thomas Nelson audio Bible production known as The Word of Promise. In this dramatized audio, Gossett played the character of John the Apostle. The project also featured a large ensemble of well known Hollywood actors including Jim Caviezel, John Rhys-Davies, Jon Voight, Gary Sinise, Jason Alexander, Christopher McDonald, Marisa Tomei and John Schneider.

In 2011, Gossett acted in film The Grace Card.

In 2013, Gossett starred in the controversial drama Boiling Pot, which is based on true events of racism that occurred on college campuses across the US during the 2008 Presidential election. The film, written and directed by the Ashmawey brothers under AshmaweyFilms, also stars Danielle Fishel, Keith David, M. Emmet Walsh, and John Heard. Gossett plays a detective attempting to decipher a murder case that was fueled by racism, all while putting aside his own prejudices. Boiling Pot was released in 2014.  Gossett returned to television in the CBS All Access series, The Good Fight, guest starring as founding partner Carl Reddick of Diane Lockhart's new firm. He narrated an audiobook based on Twelve Years a Slave. Also that year, he acted in Havre de grace an episode of Boardwalk Empire.

In 2015, Gossett acted in the miniseries The Book of Negroes.

In 2019, Gossett acted in the series Watchmen. At the Emmy Awards, he was nominated for "Outstanding supporting actor in a limited series or movie", and at the Black Reel Awards he received a nomination for "Outstanding Supporting Actor, TV Movie/Limited Series".

On July 18, 2016, Gossett cohosted as a guest programmer on Turner Classic Movies' primetime lineup. Allowed to choose four movies to air, he selected Blackboard Jungle, Lifeboat, Touch of Evil and The Night of the Hunter.

In 2021, Gossett appears in the film Not To Forget (2021), which aims to raise awareness and funds for the fight against Alzheimer's. The movie, directed by Valerio Zanoli, stars Karen Grassle and 5 Academy Award winners: Louis Gossett Jr., Cloris Leachman, Tatum O’Neal, George Chakiris, and Olympia Dukakis.

In 2022, Gossett was cast in a supporting role for the upcoming American horror film, Awaken the Reaper. The film also features performances by Lance Henriksen and Robin Curtis. Awaken the Reaper is directed by Justin Paul and Dave Campfield. The film is produced by Fourth Horizon Cinema, Impact Media Studios and Design Weapons.

Personal life

Gossett has been married three times and fathered one son and adopted one son.  His first marriage was to Hattie Glascoe; it was annulled. His second, to Christina Mangosing, took place on August 21, 1973. Their son Satie was born in 1974. Gossett and Mangosing divorced in 1975.  His third marriage, to Star Search champion Cyndi James-Reese, took place on December 25, 1987. They adopted a son, Sharron (born 1977). Gossett and James-Reese divorced in 1992.

Louis is the first cousin of actor Robert Gossett who starred on TNT's The Closer.

Gossett states that in 1966 he was handcuffed to a tree for three hours by the police in Beverly Hills.

On February 9, 2010, Gossett announced that he had prostate cancer. He added the disease was caught in its early stages, and he expected to make a full recovery.

In late December 2020, Gossett was hospitalized in Georgia with COVID-19.

Filmography

Partial accolades

Academy Awards

Emmy Awards

Golden Globe Awards

Black Reel Awards

CableACE Award

References

External links

Image of Richard Pryor and Lou Gossett backstage, 1978. Los Angeles Times Photographic Archive (Collection 1429). UCLA Library Special Collections, Charles E. Young Research Library, University of California, Los Angeles.

1936 births
20th-century American male actors
21st-century American male actors
Abraham Lincoln High School (Brooklyn) alumni
African-American male actors
African-American television producers
American male film actors
American male television actors
American male voice actors
Audiobook narrators
Television producers from New York City
Best Supporting Actor Academy Award winners
Daytime Emmy Award winners
Emmy Award winners
Best Supporting Actor Golden Globe (film) winners
Best Supporting Actor Golden Globe (television) winners
Living people
Male actors from New York City
New York University alumni
People from Sheepshead Bay, Brooklyn
Film producers from New York (state)
20th-century African-American people
21st-century African-American people
B.T. Puppy Records artists
Warner Records artists
African-American guitarists
20th-century African-American male singers
21st-century African-American male singers
African-American male singer-songwriters
American folk singers